Sitodiplosis is a genus of flies belonging to the family Cecidomyiidae.

The species of this genus are found in Europe, Eastern Asia, Northern America.

Species:

Sitodiplosis cambriensis 
Sitodiplosis dactylidis 
Sitodiplosis latiaedeagis 
Sitodiplosis mosellana 
Sitodiplosis phalaridis 
Sitodiplosis subhashensis

References

Cecidomyiidae
Cecidomyiidae genera